Sunny Anderson (born April 9, 1975) is a Food Network personality. She began hosting How'd That Get On My Plate? in July 2008. She also hosts the Food Network program Cooking for Real (beginning in April 2008), and served as co-host with Marc Istook of the Food Network program Gotta Get It (beginning in April 2007).

Early life

Sunny Anderson was born in Lawton, Oklahoma, and grew up as an Army brat, which allowed her to travel the world (living in Germany and other places) and sample many local cuisines with her parents, who were food enthusiasts. She attended Madison High School in San Antonio, Texas, and upon her graduation, she joined the United States Air Force in June 1993, where she earned the rank of Senior Airman and worked as a military radio host in Seoul, South Korea. She then worked for Air Force News Agency radio and television in San Antonio from 1993 to 1997. Anderson was honorably discharged from the Air Force in June 1997. She went to school in New Orleans at Loyola University. At age 19, Anderson was diagnosed with ulcerative colitis. in 2014, she teamed up with the Crohn's & Colitis Foundation of America to raise awareness of this disease.

Career

Between 1995 and 2001, Anderson worked as a radio personality at KCJZ and KONO-FM in San Antonio, WYLD-FM and KUMX in Fort Polk, Louisiana, WJWZ in Montgomery, Alabama, and WDTJ in Detroit, Michigan.

Anderson settled in New York City in 2001 at the age of 26, and worked as a radio personality for HOT 97 (WQHT) in New York City from 2001 to 2003. From 2003 to 2005, she was the owner of Sunny's Delicious Dishes, a catering company based in Jersey City, New Jersey.

She first appeared on the Food Network in October 2005 (as a guest on the Emeril Live program) and began hosting How'd That Get On My Plate? in July 2008. She also hosts the Food Network program Cooking for Real (beginning in April 2008), and served as co-host with Marc Istook of the Food Network program Gotta Get It, beginning in April 2007.

In 2006 and 2007, she served as Food and Lifestyle Editor for Hip Hop Weekly magazine.

In January 2014, Anderson became a co-host on the Food Network's series The Kitchen along with Jeff Mauro, Katie Lee, Marcela Valladolid, and Geoffrey Zakarian.

Anderson was a contender for the 44th Daytime Emmy Awards for the Outstanding Talk Show/Informative award with the cast of The Kitchen, but lost.

Anderson has been a guest chef on several talk shows and morning news programs including The Rachael Ray Show,  Good Morning America , The Early Show, The View, The Talk, as well as The Wendy Williams Show.

In 2022, Anderson hosted NFL Tailgate Takedown along with New England Patriots Hall-of-Famer Vince Wilfork.

In October 2022 she hosted Season 3 of Outrageous Pumpkins on Food Network.

See also 
 List of people diagnosed with ulcerative colitis

References

External links
 
 

Food Network chefs
African-American television personalities
United States Air Force airmen
1975 births
American television chefs
American radio personalities
People from Lawton, Oklahoma
Female United States Air Force personnel
Living people
African-American chefs
American women chefs
Chefs from Oklahoma
Chefs from New York City
21st-century African-American people
21st-century African-American women
20th-century African-American people
20th-century African-American women